Franco Daniel Jara (born 15 July 1988) is an Argentine professional footballer who plays as a forward.

Club career
Born in Villa María, Córdoba, Jara made his professional debut with Arsenal de Sarandí, first appearing in the Primera División in a 0–1 home loss against Argentinos Juniors on 23 May 2008. He scored his first goal for the club on 10 April of the following year, in a 1–1 draw at Club Atlético Colón.

On 30 January 2010, Jara signed a five-year deal with Portuguese champions S.L. Benfica for a transfer fee of €5.5 million, effective for the beginning of 2010–11. He scored in his second official game, a 1–2 home loss to Académica de Coimbra on 15 August, and finished his first season with 43 competitive appearances (11 goals).

Jara was loaned to newly promoted La Liga side Granada CF in late August 2011, moving to Andalusia alongside several other Benfica teammates. On 21 July of the following year, still owned by the latter, he joined San Lorenzo de Almagro, and the same happened in the 2013–14 campaign, this time with Estudiantes de La Plata.

On 24 January 2015, Jara signed for two and a half years with Olympiacos F.C. in a €1.5 million transfer fee. His Super League Greece debut occurred on 1 February in a 2–0 away win over Veria FC. He scored his first goal two months later, in a 3–1 victory at Panthrakikos FC.

On 23 May 2015, Jara intercepted a backward pass inside the area in the last minute of the first half of the final of the Greek Football Cup, helping the Piraeus-based team to a record 27th conquest after defeating Skoda Xanthi F.C. 3–1 at the Olympic Stadium. On 9 September, he joined Mexican club C.F. Pachuca on a free transfer. He scored a career-best 17 times while at the service of the latter side in 2015–16's Liga MX, helping them win the Clausura tournament, adding six in eight matches for the champions of the following season's CONCACAF Champions League and being voted the competition's best player.

Jara signed for FC Dallas of the Major League Soccer on 21 January 2020, with the deal being made effective in July. On 10 January 2023, Jara and Dallas mutually agreed to terminate his contract at the club.

On the 11th of January 2023, Jara signed a contract with Atlético Belgrano while he was a free agent.

International career
On 19 January 2010, Jara was called up to the Argentina national team for a friendly match with Costa Rica on the 27th. The game finished 3–2, and he scored the match-winning goal.

Jara earned his second cap on 10 February 2010, in a 2–1 win against Jamaica.

Personal life
On 10 September 2014, Jara suffered a car accident and crashed into a tree, but did not suffer major injuries.

Career statistics

Club

International

International goals

|-
|1|| 26 January 2010 || Ingeniero Hilario Sánchez, San Juan, Argentina ||  || align=center | 3–2 || align=center | 3–2 || Friendly || 
|}

Honours

Benfica
Primeira Liga: 2014–15
Taça da Liga: 2010–11
Supertaça Cândido de Oliveira: 2014

Olympiacos
Super League Greece: 2014–15
Greek Football Cup: 2014–15

Pachuca
Liga MX: Clausura 2016
CONCACAF Champions League: 2016–17

Individual
CONCACAF Champions League Golden Ball: 2016–17

References

External links

Argentine League statistics at Fútbol XXI 

1988 births
Living people
People from Villa María
Sportspeople from Córdoba Province, Argentina
Argentine footballers
Association football forwards
Argentine Primera División players
Arsenal de Sarandí footballers
San Lorenzo de Almagro footballers
Estudiantes de La Plata footballers
Primeira Liga players
S.L. Benfica footballers
La Liga players
Granada CF footballers
Super League Greece players
Olympiacos F.C. players
Liga MX players
C.F. Pachuca players
Major League Soccer players
Designated Players (MLS)
FC Dallas players
Argentina international footballers
Argentine expatriate footballers
Expatriate footballers in Portugal
Expatriate footballers in Spain
Expatriate footballers in Greece
Expatriate footballers in Mexico
Expatriate soccer players in the United States
Argentine expatriate sportspeople in Portugal
Argentine expatriate sportspeople in Spain
Argentine expatriate sportspeople in Greece
Argentine expatriate sportspeople in Mexico
Argentine expatriate sportspeople in the United States